Mandrovo is a rural locality (a selo) and the administrative center of Mandrovskoye Rural Settlement, Valuysky District, Belgorod Oblast, Russia. The population was 977 as of 2010. There are 15 streets.

Geography 
Mandrovo is located 20 km northeast of Valuyki (the district's administrative centre) by road. Voronovka is the nearest rural locality.

References 

Rural localities in Valuysky District